Ondrej Šmelko (born 1 September 1967) is a former Slovak international football defender who played for clubs in Czechoslovakia and Russia.

Career
Born in Bardejov, Šmelko began playing football for FK Inter Bratislava. He would make 38 appearances in the Czechoslovak first division with Inter Bratislava, and a further 22 appearances in the Czech first division with FC Svit Zlín. He enjoyed a successful spell with Slovak side Ozeta Dukla Trenčín, and joined Russian side FC Gazovik-Gazprom Izhevsk for the 2003 Russian First Division season.

Šmelko made several appearances for the Slovakia national football team.

After he retired from playing professional football, Šmelko became a football coach for AS Trenčín's youth team at age 41.

References

External links

Profile at KLISF

1967 births
Living people
Slovak footballers
Slovak expatriate footballers
Slovakia international footballers
FK Inter Bratislava players
FC Fastav Zlín players
AS Trenčín players
Expatriate footballers in Russia

Association football defenders
People from Bardejov
Sportspeople from the Prešov Region